Pignotti is a surname of Italian origin. Notable people with the surname include:

 Lamberto Pignotti (born 1926), Italian poet, writer, and visual artist
  (1739–1812), Italian poet and historian
 Ugo Pignotti (1908–1989), Italian fencer

See also
 Pinotti

Italian-language surnames
it:Pignotti